The Hope Church of All Saints is a ruined church building on Romney Marsh, about  north-west of New Romney, in Kent, England, near the road from Ivychurch to New Romney. Since 2017 a sculpture park has been created on the site.

History
It is thought that the church, in the former parish of Hope, was founded in the 12th century. It was still in use in 1543, but had fallen into decay by 1573; the bells were removed to the Church of St Nicholas at New Romney. Hope Church was recorded as ruinous in 1663.

There have been surface finds of medieval objects near the site, including coins from the 11th to the 13th century. These, and traces of a possible sunken road near the church, suggest that there was a deserted medieval village nearby.

Description
The site is a scheduled monument; the standing remains are Grade II listed.

The church, rectangular in plan, is built of roughly coursed stone interspersed with flint. There is a similar block at the south-east corner of the chancel. The surviving walls are linked by foundations.

Sculpture park
The IMOS Foundation, an arts charity founded by Briony Kapoor, undertook the care of the site in February 2017. Four bridges were erected across the surrounding ditch to improve access to the church, and more than 200 trees have been planted. A sculpture park has been created: the sculptures include those of saints of all kinds, since "... the idea evolved... to use... the widest possible meaning of the word ALL in All Saints."

References

Scheduled monuments in Kent
Grade II listed churches in Kent
Church ruins in England
Ruins in Kent
Sculpture gardens, trails and parks in the United Kingdom